NHL FaceOff 2001 is an ice hockey video game developed by SolWorks for PlayStation and by 989 Sports for PlayStation 2, and published by Sony Computer Entertainment America for both games in 2000–2001. On the cover is then-Toronto Maple Leafs player Curtis Joseph.

Reception

The PlayStation version received "generally favorable reviews", while the PlayStation 2 version received "mixed" reviews, according to the review aggregation website Metacritic. Tom Russo of Next Generation said that the latter console version was "Not terrible hockey, but it's a farm-league, rookie effort to the polished package and graphical splendor of EA's NHL 2001."

References

External links
 

2000 video games
NHL FaceOff
North America-exclusive video games
PlayStation (console) games
PlayStation 2 games
Video games developed in the United States
Video games set in 2001